Gusevka is a rural locality (a selo) in Choysky District, the Altai Republic, Russia. The population was 363 as of 2016. There are 3 streets.

Geography 
Gusevka is located 4 km north of Choya (the district's administrative centre) by road. Choya is the nearest rural locality.

References 

Rural localities in Choysky District